GMM may refer to:
Generalized method of moments, an econometric method
GMM Grammy, a Thai entertainment company
Gaussian mixture model, a statistical probabilistic model
Google Map Maker, a public cartography project
GMM, IATA code for Gamboma Airport in the Republic of the Congo
Good Mythical Morning, an online morning talk show hosted by YouTubers, Rhett and Link
Global Marijuana March, a worldwide demonstration associated with cannabis culture
Graspop Metal Meeting, a Belgian heavy metal festival held annually in Dessel
Gimar Montaz Mautino, a french manufacturer of ski lifts